DJhistory.com is a website dedicated to the history of dance music and DJing, and also an online record label and book publishing company. It aims to encourage interest in obscure, overlooked and collectable dance music (in its broadest sense), by creating an archive of reference material on the subject and by licensing and reissuing rare and exceptional music for download.

History
DJhistory.com was launched in November 1999 by dance music historians Bill Brewster and Frank Broughton as an online continuation of their book Last Night A DJ Saved My Life. The website developed into an expert forum of DJs and dance music collectors sharing knowledge about back-catalogue music, including notable DJs François Kevorkian, David Mancuso, Greg Wilson, Prins Thomas and Todd Terje.

Content
DJhistory.com contains full-length transcripts of interviews with many notable DJs and dance music pioneers, which were the source material for Broughton and Brewster’s books; an archive of magazine articles relating to the history of dance music; reviews of music, books and DVDs; and "Mystery Mixes", DJ mixes of obscure music which the site’s forum members attempt to identify.

In March 2008, DJhistory.com was relaunched with the addition of a music download service selling digital versions of rare and collectable records, including its signature "Secret Weapons" series of powerful but obscure or overlooked dance tracks chosen by a notable DJ from their own collection.

Discography
 DJH-SW001 Secret Weapons 1: Chris Duckenfield's Steely Torpedoes
 DJH-CP001 The Very Best of Swag
 DJH-SW002 Secret Weapons 2: Rhythm Doctor's Bloody Scalpels
 DJH-CP002 Le Disco: Tele Music Remixed

References

External links
 Official website
 DJhistory MySpace page
  Power, Mike. "Dance music's virtual basement is now open", The Guardian music blog, 2008-09-19

British record labels
Companies based in London
Netlabels
Online music stores of the United Kingdom